Elite 2 may refer to:

Beretta Elite II, an air pistol
Elite 2 (rugby league), the second tier semi-professional rugby league competition in France
Elite Two, the second division of the Cameroon association football league system
Frontier: Elite II, a space trading and combat simulator video game

See also
Elite (disambiguation)